Canal 7 may refer to::

Canal 7 of Buenos Aires, Argentina
Canal 7 of Lima, Peru
Canal 7 of Mendoza, Argentina
Canal 7 of Mexico City, Mexico
Canal 7 of Quito, Ecuador
Canal 7 of Santiago, Chile
Canal 7 of La Paz, Bolivia 

Canal 7 of Murcia, Spain
Canal 7 of San José, Costa Rica
Super Siete of Puerto Rico